George Archibald (6 October 1919 – 27 January 2006) was a former Australian rules footballer who played with Melbourne in the Victorian Football League (VFL).

Notes

External links 

1919 births
2006 deaths
Australian rules footballers from Victoria (Australia)
Melbourne Football Club players